Acanthocasuarina is a genus of bugs from the jumping plant lice family (Triozidae). The genus is endemic to Australia, and currently contains six species ( et al., 2011).

Species
 Acanthocasuarina acutivalvis Taylor, 2011
 Acanthocasuarina campestris Taylor, 2011
 Acanthocasuarina diminutae Taylor, 2011
 Acanthocasuarina muellerianae Taylor, 2011
 Acanthocasuarina tasmanica Taylor, 2011
 Acanthocasuarina verticillatae Taylor, 2011

References
  et al. 2011: A new genus and ten new species of jumping plant lice (Hemiptera: Triozidae) from Allocasuarina (Casuarinaceae) in Australia. Zootaxa, 3009: 1-45. Preview

Triozidae
Psylloidea genera